First Daze Here Too (2006) is the second of two compilation albums of 1970s Pentagram material, released by Relapse Records. It was preceded by First Daze Here (The Vintage Collection) (2001).

Track listing

Disc 1
 "Wheel of Fortune"-4:03 (Bobby Liebling/Geof O'Keefe)
 Recorded live in studio June 5 and 14, 1974 at National Sound Warehouse
 "When the Screams Come"-2:47 (Liebling)
 Recorded live in studio June 5 and 14, 1974 at National Sound Warehouse
 "Under My Thumb"-3:17 (The Rolling Stones)
 Recorded September 8, 1974 at Track Studios
 "Smokescreen"-4:05 (Liebling/O'Keefe)
 Recorded September 4, 13 and 23, 1976 at Underground Sound
 "Teaser"-3:27 (O'Keefe)
 Recorded September 4, 13 and 23, 1976 at Underground Sound
 "Little Games"-2:57 (The Yardbirds)
 Recorded September 4, 13 and 23, 1976 at Underground Sound
 "Much Too Young to Know"-4:34 (Liebling/O'Keefe)
 Recorded September 4, 13 and 23, 1976 at Underground Sound

Disc 2
 "Virgin Death"-1:42 (Liebling)
 "Yes I Do"-2:14 (Liebling)
 "Ask No More"-2:36 (Liebling)
 "Man"-1:57 (O'Keefe)
 "Be Forewarned"-3:59 (Liebling)
 "Catwalk"-3:34 (Liebling)
 "Die in Your Sleep"-1:39 (Liebling)
 "Frustration"-2:03 (Liebling)
 Recorded 1973 at American Mailing Warehouse
 "Target"-7:26 (Liebling)
 Recorded 1973 at American Mailing Warehouse
 "Everything's Turning to Night"-2:29 (Liebling/O'Keefe)
 Recorded 1973 at American Mailing Warehouse
 "Take Me Away"-2:19 (O'Keefe)
 "Nightmare Gown"-2:16 (Liebling)
 "Cartwheel"-2:54 (Liebling)
 "Cat & Mouse"-2:45 (O'Keefe)
 "Show 'Em How"-10:02 (Liebling)

All tracks recorded 1972–1974 at the American Mailing Warehouse except where noted.

Lineup 
Bobby Liebling – vocals
Vincent McAllister – guitar
Greg Mayne – bass
Geof O'Keefe – drums
Randy Palmer – guitar on "Wheel of Fortune", "When the Screams Come" and "Under My Thumb"
Marty Iverson – guitar on "Smokescreen", "Teaser", "Much Too Young to Know" and "Little Games"

Pentagram (band) compilation albums
2006 compilation albums
Relapse Records compilation albums